Alexandre Colin may refer to:
Alexander Colyn, Flemish sculptor
Alexandre-Marie Colin, French painter and engraver